RKS is a global design firm and innovation consultancy founded in 1980 by industrial designer Ravi Sawhney. The company designs and develops consumer, medical, and industrial products, as well as user interfaces, and user experiences. It is known for designing Teddy Ruxpin and RKS Guitars.

Psycho-Aesthetics Human-Centered Methodology 
The company developed a design-thinking methodology called Psycho-Aesthetics, a process that helps designers focus on understanding consumer need and emotions. Psycho-Aesthetics is taught at UCLA, USC, SCAD, and Harvard Business School.

The Psycho-Aesthetics Sprint has seven phases:

 Research
 Synthesis
 Key Attractors
 Hero's Journey
 Design
 Execution
 Moments of Truth

Design projects 
Using the approach, the company designed Lego's sustainable packaging, Teddy Ruxpin, a popular children's toy in the 1980s and early 1990s,
 the RKS Guitar, a sustainable electric guitar, in collaboration with Dave Mason, and Gamevice mobile controller for Wikipad.

See also 
 Ammunition Design
 Ideo
 Frog
 Designworks
 Smart Design
 Product design

References

External links 
 Office site

Industrial design firms
Product designers
1980 establishments in California
Design companies of the United States